Blewitt is a surname. Notable people with the surname include:

 Brett Blewitt (born 1976), Australian actor
 Charles Blewitt (1877–1937), English cricketer
 Chris Blewitt (born 1995), American football player
 Darren Blewitt (b. 1985), English footballer
 Edward Francis Blewitt (1859-1926), Pennsylvania State Senator
 Joe Blewitt (1895–1954), British athlete
 Jonathan Blewitt (1782–1853), English organist and composer
 Simon Blewitt (b. 1959, AKA Sam Blue), English rock singer

See also
Blewit, two species of edible mushrooms
Blewitt Springs, Adelaide, Australia
Blewett, a surname
Bluet (disambiguation)
Bluett, a surname
Hinton Blewitt, a village and civil parish in Somerset, England
Bluiett, a surname